Kathy Radzuweit (born 4 November 1977 in East-Berlin) is a retired German volleyball player.

She played at the 2002 FIVB Volleyball Women's World Championship in Germany. On club level she played with SSV Blautal Center Ulm.

References

External links 
 https://muehlacker-tagblatt.de/archiv/volleyball-ade-verena-veh-hoert-auf/
 http://www.cev.lu/Competition-Area/PlayerDetails.aspx?TeamID=3436&PlayerID=16561&ID=108
 http://www.schwaebische.de/home_artikel,-_arid,624320.html

 

German women's volleyball players
1977 births
Living people